The Feeling of Being Watched is a 2018 documentary film directed and produced by Assia Boundaoui in her directorial debut. The film stars Assia Boundaoui with Rabia Boundaoui, Iman Boundaoui, Nouha Boundaoui, Sohib Boundaoui, and Christina Abraham. The plot follows Boundaoui as she investigates rumors that her Arab-American neighborhood outside Chicago is being monitored by the Federal Bureau of Investigation (FBI).

It had its world premiere at the Tribeca Film Festival on April 21, 2018. It was released on June 21, 2019, by Women Make Movies. The Feeling of Being Watched won Best Documentary at the BlackStar Film Festival and the Camden International Film Festival. It was nominated for the Audience Award at the Glasgow Film Festival, and Best Documentary at CAAMFest.

Synopsis 
Assia Boundaoui grew up in the Arab-American neighborhood of Bridgeview, Illinois, a suburb of Chicago which counts among its residents about 200 Muslim families. Her neighbors believe they have been under surveillance for a decade or more. When she explores her neighbors' experiences, Assia discovers thousands of pages of FBI documents which prove that the neighborhood was the subject of counter-terrorism investigation before the September 11 attacks. Code-named "Operation Vulgar Betrayal", the surveillance operation amassed more than 30,000 documents on Muslim residents and neighborhood organizations, though no arrests or links to terrorist activity were ever made.

Cast 
Credits adapted from Rotten Tomatoes:

 Assia Boundaoui as herself
 Rabia Boundaoui as Assia's mother
 Iman Boundaoui as Assia's sister
 Nouha Boundaoui as Assia's sister
 Sohib Boundaoui as Assia's brother
 Christina Abraham as Assia's lawyer

Production 
On 23 September 2019, director Assia Boundaoui and producer Alex Bushe launched a Kickstarter campaign to raise funds for a documentary film. The campaign raised $33,057 out of a $30,000 goal, with 187 backers. After they raised $33,057 the duo wrote on Kickstarter,

Boundaoui returned to Bridgeview as a qualified journalist to interview family and neighbors about what they remembered about the surveillance. In the 1990s, this included low-flying helicopters passing frequently overhead, cameras mounted on buildings, and vans parked outside houses. Boundaoui then documents her appeals to the Department of Justice to uncover the truth of government spying. The film shows the support she received from family and neighbors; one family friend is seen chiding her affectionately, "You troublemaker, you!"

Reception

Critical response 
Metacritic, which uses a weighted average, assigned the film a score of 79 out of 100, based on 5 critics, indicating "Generally favorable reviews".

Sheri Linden of The Hollywood Reporter wrote: "The chilling effect of a life under surveillance is at the heart of the film. As it pieces together the timeline of events in the director's Chicago suburb and beyond, The Feeling of Being Watched takes shape as an incisive inquiry". Guy Lodge writing for Variety wrote: "Shot and cut to match its maker's no-nonsense drive, this tense, frightening film culminates in a more hopeful call to activist arms, finding as much security in ethnic and religious communities as others do suspicion".

Nathanael Hood writing for The Young Folks criticized the film for not living up to its potential; he commended the first third of the film as it "magnificently captures the feeling of nervous menace felt by the people of Bridgeview", but Boundaoui's requests for documents from the Department of Justice do not convey a "cohesive sense of urgency". However he praised The Feeling of Being Watched for "seeking justice for a persecuted minority".

Accolades

References

External links 

 

2018 directorial debut films
2018 films
2018 documentary films
American documentary films
2010s English-language films
2010s American films